Wanita dan Satria (Indonesian for The Woman and the Hero) is a 1941 film from the Dutch East Indies (now Indonesia) directed by Rd Ariffien and produced by Ang Hock Liem for Union Films that is probably lost. Starring Djoewariah, Ratna Djoewita, Hidajat, Z. Algadrie, and Moesa, it follows a womaniser named Soedrajat who abuses his status to gain women's trust before ultimately getting his comeuppance. Reviews were mostly positive, with one praising the film's depiction of women's issues in a Muslim society.

Plot
Soedrajat abuses his high social status in order to womanise and becomes his rich uncle's heir despite the latter having a son, the kindly and noble Soelarsa. The uncle is disappointed with Soelarsa and considers Soedrajat the better man. Being considered high class, he is unwilling to associate with people of the lower classes. Ultimately Soedrajat falls for a beautiful young woman, Koestijah. Meanwhile, Soelarsa saves Koestijah's life while driving a truck through her village; the two fall in love at first sight. By manipulating Koestijah's father, Soedrajat arranges for her to marry him.

At the wedding, however, the terrible truth about Soedrajat is revealed. One of his former conquests, Tarmini, stands up and tells the crowd, including Soelarsa, of the bridegroom's true nature. In a rage, Soedrajat takes a revolver and shoots Tarmini. With her dying breath, Tarmini makes one last confession. Her father then takes revenge on Soedrajat.

Production
Wanita dan Satria was produced by Ang Hock Liem for Union Films. It was directed by Rd Ariffien, a former theatre leader and nationalist journalist who had made his directorial debut the preceding year with Harta Berdarah. The story was written by Saeroen, a former journalist with several screenwriting credits for Union.

The black-and-white film starred Djoewariah, Ratna Djoewita, Hidajat, Z. Algadrie, and Moesa. Moesa was the most experienced of these: he had entered the industry in 1938 with Fatima, a production by Tan's Film, and had been with Union since 1940. Djoewariah had been on Union's payroll since Bajar dengan Djiwa in 1940, while Ratna Djoewita and Hidajat had not appeared in any films before 1941.

Release and reception
Wanita dan Satria was released in 1941, reaching Bandung by August and Surabaya by September. The film was open to all ages. A novelisation was published later in 1941 by the Yogyakarta-based Kolff-Buning. As part of the growing movement to attract Indonesian intellectuals, the marketing staff emphasised the respectable (non-theatrical) background of the actors; the intelligentsia had little respect for traditional theatre and its players.

A review in the Surabaya-based Soerabaijasch Handelsblad wrote that the film "gives a clear picture of the precarious position of Indonesian women and motivates the desire for a firmer outline of her rights in the Moslem society." Another review in the same newspaper wrote that the film "is captivating from start to finish", one which "the film audience in Surabaya should certainly not miss".

Legacy
After Wanita dan Satria, Union produced a further two films; none of these were by Rd. Ariffien, who had left the company. Saeroen likewise left soon after, joining Star Film. Djoewariah continued to act until the 1950s, when she migrated to theatre after receiving a series of increasingly minor roles. Neither Ratna Djoewita nor Hidajat appeared in any films after 1941.

The film is likely lost; the American visual anthropologist Karl G. Heider writes that all Indonesian films from before 1950 are lost. However, JB Kristanto's Katalog Film Indonesia (Indonesian Film Catalogue) records several as having survived at Sinematek Indonesia's archives, and Biran writes that several Japanese propaganda films have survived at the Netherlands Government Information Service.

Explanatory notes

References

Works cited

 
 

 
 
 

 
 

Indonesian black-and-white films
Films directed by Rd Ariffien
Union Films films